Mansour is a given name and a surname.

Mansour may also refer to:

 Mansour (singer) (born 1971), Iranian singer
 Mansour district, an administrative district of Baghdad, named for Al-Mansur
 Mansour neighbourhood, a neighborhood within Mansour district, Baghdad
 Mansour Group, an Egyptian company
 20416 Mansour, a main-belt asteroid
 Mansour (TV Series), an Emirati animated television series

See also
 Mansur (disambiguation)